Bafruiyeh (also Romanized as Bafrū’īyeh and Bafruyeh) is a new city in Bafruiyeh District of Meybod County, Yazd province, Iran. At the 2006 census, its population was 5,752 in 1,578 households, when it was a village in Bafruiyeh Rural District of the Central District. The following census in 2011 counted 6,486 people in 1,895 households, by which time it had become the capital of the newly established Bafruiyeh District. The latest census in 2016 showed a population of 6,939 people in 2,105 households.

References 

Meybod County

Cities in Yazd Province

Populated places in Yazd Province

Populated places in Meybod County